Gregor Ewan (born 28 June 1971) is a Scottish wheelchair curler who competed for Great Britain at the 2014 Winter Paralympics. It was his Paralympic debut.

Career
He won a bronze medal at the 2014 Winter Paralympics at Sochi with the British team beating China 7–3 in the third-place play-off match.

References

External links

 

1971 births
Living people
Scottish male curlers
Scottish wheelchair curlers
Paralympic wheelchair curlers of Great Britain
Paralympic medalists in wheelchair curling
Paralympic bronze medalists for Great Britain
Wheelchair curlers at the 2014 Winter Paralympics
Wheelchair curlers at the 2018 Winter Paralympics
Wheelchair curlers at the 2022 Winter Paralympics
Medalists at the 2014 Winter Paralympics